Clement Laird Brumbaugh (February 28, 1863 – September 28, 1921) was an American educator and politician who served as a U.S. Representative from Ohio for four terms from 1913 to 1921.

Early life and education
Born on a farm near Pikeville, in Darke County, Ohio, Brumbaugh attended the district schools and Greenville High School in Greenville, Ohio.
He taught school, worked on a farm, and tutored.
He was graduated from National Normal University, Lebanon, Ohio, in 1887.

He was related to the infamous World War I aviator and barnstormer, Dr. David Brumbaugh.

He founded and conducted the Van Buren Academy from 1887 to 1891.

He attended Ohio Wesleyan University, Delaware, Ohio from 1891 to 1893.
He graduated from Harvard University in 1894.

Early career
After this Brumbaugh taught school in Washington, D.C. from 1894 to 1896.  Next he served as Superintendent of schools in Greenville, Ohio from 1896 to 1900.

He studied law and was admitted to the bar in 1900 and commenced practice in Columbus, Ohio.

He served as member of the State house of representatives 1900-1904, serving as minority leader.

Congress
Brumbaugh was elected as a Democrat to the Sixty-third and to the three succeeding Congresses (March 4, 1913 – March 3, 1921).
He served as chairman of the Committee on Railways and Canals (Sixty-fifth Congress).
He was not a candidate for renomination in 1920.

Retirement and death
He lived in retirement in Columbus, Ohio, until his death there on September 28, 1921. He was interred in Greenville Union Cemetery in  Greenville, Ohio.

Sources

External links
 

1863 births
1921 deaths
People from Greenville, Ohio
National Normal University alumni
Ohio Wesleyan University alumni
Harvard University alumni
Democratic Party members of the Ohio House of Representatives
Ohio lawyers
Burials in Ohio
Democratic Party members of the United States House of Representatives from Ohio
19th-century American lawyers